The design of the coat of arms of the Republic of Nauru originated in 1968 following the declaration of independence, and it began to be used officially in the early 1970s.

Its shield is divided and separated in the middle.  In the upper section the alchemical symbol of phosphorus is shown over a golden woven background.

The lower silver section depicts a black frigatebird, which sits on a perch over blue ocean waves.  The lower right section is blue and contains a branch of calophyllum flowers.  The shield is surrounded by images of tribal chief gear, which was worn to ceremonies - ropes from palm leaves, feathers of the frigatebird and shark teeth.  The star centered above the shield is taken from the flag. The ribbon above it bears the name of the island in Micronesian Nauruan: Naoero.  

The ribbon under the shield bears the national motto of the Republic of Nauru: God's Will First.   

The woven background symbolizes the people of Nauru; the frigatebird the fauna there; the alchemical symbol for phosphorus, the mining of phosphates.

References

External links 
Image of the national coat of arms of Nauru

Nauru
National symbols of Nauru
Nauru
Nauru
Nauru
1968 establishments in Nauru
Nauru